Lago Ranco is a town and commune in southern Chile administered by the  Municipality of Lago Ranco. It is located in Ranco Province in Los Ríos Region. Lago Ranco takes its name from Ranco Lake, which it shares with the commune of Futrono.

History 
Ranco Lake Basin was inhabited since ancient times by indigenous people belonging to Huilliche "people of the south", which was characterized by a more peaceful than that of the Mapuche. Although this was not the norm, as demonstrated in the great rebellion led by toqui Pelantaru in 1599 and that meant the destruction and abandonment of cities and fountains built by the Spanish conquistadors south of the Bío-Bío.
But most of the life of the Huilliche communities in the area, spent a relatively quiet in close contact with the natural environment that gave them their livelihood: the gathering, hunting, fishing, livestock and incipient agriculture, were the activities that allowed him to maintain their sedentary lifestyle and the development of certain cultural expressions.
During the colonial period this picture changed little, remaining outside the territories of the colonization process, only rarely are noticed some attempts to integrate this area to civilized life, for example, through missionary work of the Jesuits from the fortifications of Quinchilca in the north, and San José de Alcudia, on the south, on the banks of the river Well, west of the lake.
The geographical setting in which they lived Huilliches communities in our area were Maihue lacustrine basins and Ranco, both lakes located in the pre-Andean area and connected by the river Calcurrupe.
In this geographical setting that had its genesis in the last glacial period, the Quaternary-lived the early inhabitants of this place, and each sector was taking a name that identifies you to present: Maihue, Curriñe, Chabranco, hueinahue and Rupumeica, Cars in Maihue sector. TRINGL, Ranco, Huapi, Calcurrupe, Llifén, Illahuapi, Pocuro, Riñinahue, Pitreño, Ilihue, Quillaico, Ignatieff, Pitriuco in the area of Lago Ranco.

During the Republican era in the nineteenth and twentieth centuries, the Chilean state must promote a process of settlement and integration of their individual territories, the national life. But its location in the pre-Andean sector the Lake Ranco was not an objective considered in this process whose attention was focused on the longitudinal valley and the coastal sector. Still, in 1846 the cartographer Bernardo Phillippi, drew up a map of the province of Valdivia, made at the time by the departments of Valdivia and Osorno.
Another nineteenth-century historical record indicates that in 1885 the Department of Valdivia was divided into sub-delegations and districts, such as sub No. 8 of Quinchilca was established, which included the districts of Quinchilca, Riñihue and Maihue. The latter is the land area basis for future community of Lago Ranco.
The first colonists who settled on the banks of Lake Ranco, arrived from the late nineteenth century, which motivated his adventurous spirit took up residence in the western sector of the Lake, in the areas of Hueimen and Ignatieff, natural beauty and the immense wealth of native forests was a major reason why families continue to arrive by German colonists, who formed the vanguard of settlement in this place and encouraged the integration with the central valley.
Among these early families were Konust, Daniel and Rettig, whose descendants still develop the entrepreneurial spirit of their ancestors.
On the other hand, you should also mention other families from these places whose descendants represents the link with the ancestral past. These families may include: Ancacura, Huaito, Huenuman, Quichel, NEIP, Antilaf, Calfulef, Millape, Curinao, Calfumil, Catrihual and others, which are an example of the historical heritage of the ancestors Huilliches.

Gesta Railroad 
The construction of a railway between Cocula (southern sector of La Union) and Lago Ranco began in 1928, this project was initiated by the first settlers: Konust, Daniel and Rettig, who, with business vision prompted this action. The branch was completed in the 1930s, was at first only to Ignatieff, while difficult to solve the section called "Return of the Guitar", at the height of Quillaico.
Once the railway lines in its path, began a slow settling of population engaged in preference to the work resulting from logging, which was the main economic activity of the time and the main objective of the railway.
So in the first instance, this town received the name of Punta de Rails, later by expansion into the hills, was renamed Pérez Rosales TRINGL and then drive in honor of German colonization in the area.
In 1935 he prepared the first master plan for this fledgling town. In 1937 by Decree ordered the auction of public lands into subdivisions, which later gave rise to the town.

On February 14, 1941, under the government of Pedro Aguirre Cerda, Lagoe Ranco, was formally granted the status of a commune.
Decree Law No. 6826 carried and article No. 1 stated: "Believe the commune sub-delegation of Lake Ranco, Department of Rio Bueno. His head is the village of Ranco Lake, located south of Lake Ranco."
The respective decree also sets the limits of the new community and set the procedure for holding elections to form the new municipality.
With the creation of the commune in 1941, begins to intensify the slow process of urbanization and community development; since then has been unfolding is communal life with the push of its authorities and citizens and with the support of central governments, as This has led to greater integration with neighboring communities, particularly the town of Rio Bueno.
Significant activity is to highlight the lake in 1947 and recorded a great climax. Several steamers plied the waters of Lake Ranco, covering different areas in a large area stretching from Puerto Rettig, and the same Ranco, until Riñinahue, Llifén, Futrono, Isla Huapi and Puerto Nuevo. A whole era marked vapors as the Laja, the Saturn, Osorno, Lili, the Valdivia, going back and bringing people and goods on the waters of Ranco, rarely troubled by the puihua. Several of them were destroyed by the force of black puelche. One of the major works undertaken in the commune, has been the building of the Liceo Antonio Varas, "which concluded in 1960, the stock of education certainly has become a cornerstone of the municipality's development in educational level, social and cultural.
The force of nature, through their violent demonstrations has not been absent during the twentieth century are remembered two major natural disasters: the eruption of Cars in 1955 and the 1960 earthquake, which caused concern and damage, then overcome.
Another important milestone in the history community, were determined by the regionalization process driven from 1974, which established the autonomy of the town of Lake Ranco, but also meant segregated Llifén eastern sector, which was integrated into the Futrono commune.

Demographics

Of these, 2,205 (21.8%) lived in urban areas and 7,893 (78.2%) in rural areas. The population fell by 3.5% (362 persons) between the 1992 and 2002 censuses.

Hydrography 
The community of Lake Ranco has numerous streams, which belong to the Andean sector of the watershed of the Rio Bueno, Andean valley with 17 210 km ² with a distance of 130 km east–west. The river Well get as many tributaries from the south bank by presenting a high rainfall regime and shows characteristics rushing mountain range with nival.1 The river system is good natural drainage of Lake Ranco which is 443 km ² to 69 m and 199 m maximum depth, characterized by being the second largest lake in area within the territory of Lake Ranco nacional.1 fall in water from Lake Maihue with an area of 49 km ² and Huishue, which lie north of Caulle cord. Also drains into Lake Ranco Riñinahue River, which rises near the Nevada Mountains, close to the limits of the National Park Puyehue.
Buttress Rivers, Deer and Nilahue born north of Puyehue volcano, draining the central sector of the volcanic zone Puyehue - Carr, both rivers join near the volcano Carran, taking the name of Nilahue River, which flows to the east of Lake Ranco.
In the area of the Cordillera Nevada, born Iculpe River, which empties into the southern shore of Lake Ranco, near the village of Lake Ranco.
Gray Lake is located in the southwest of the town of Lake Ranco and within the Puyehue National Park, with an approximate area of 9 km ² and 1,000 meters. The lake gives rise to the White River, which joins the river Chol Chol, the latter being born of the lagoon Twins. These rivers flow into Lake Huishue. Also flows into the lake the stream the Virgin, who was born northwest of Lake Gris.

Weather 
Three types of very different climates can be found in Lago Ranco: the so-called rainy temperate climate with Mediterranean influence (Cfsb) mountain weather (G) and icy climate by the effect of height (EFH).
The first type of climate is developed between the Cordillera Pre - Andean Middle surrounding the Depression. Not to be characterized by a dry season rainfall occurring throughout the year, presenting however some features of a break during the warm season rainfall. In this temperate rainforest does not have large temperature swings. This is facilitated by the liquid surface of Lake Ranco, moreover, prevents frost on its banks. During the spring and summer there is a persistent cloudiness that tends to dissipate by noon, which is known as South negro.
The mountain climate is evident in the Andes, in some sectors of the foothills. It is above curve at 500 m, height corresponding approximately to the development of 5 °C isotherm in the coldest month and even that disappears where tree-like vegetation, the effect of low temperatures.
The third type of weather that occurs in the town of Lake Ranco is the icy climate by the effect of height, which takes place in high mountain areas, where the elevation exceeds 3,000 m, the conditions in such sectors are broken between a climate of tundra, no trees, to a climate of perpetual snow without vegetation with increasing altitude.

The community of Lake Ranco is characterized by rainfall throughout the year. The average annual rainfall reaches Lake Ranco 2020 mm, while in the lake Maihue is 4072 mm. This shows that precipitation increases as height increases, resulting in increased rainfall in the commune in its eastern sector.

In the commune averages temperatures descend towards the east, however there are large areas close to the lake where temperatures are conditioned by the thermal moderating effect. The mean maximum and minimum temperatures are recorded annually in the months of January and July.
Lago Ranco temperature for between 3 and 20 °C and the lake Maihue between 0 and 18 °C. The municipality has no dry months, but the most affected by this natural phenomenon are the months of February for Lake Ranco and December for the lake Maihue.

In the town of Lake Ranco winds prevail northwest, southwest and west. Along with that winds are typical, as the Puigua or Puelche over all the commune, which dry the air in the summer and cause storms at invierno.

The fauna is closely related to the vegetation existing in the area, called Valdivian rainforest, which is characterized by the high proportion of endemic species, i.e. species whose distribution area is bounded in this region. However, many of these species are in danger of extinction due to man's unconsciousness. The most common mammals in these forests are the winks, pudú whose preferred habitat is the forest and ulmo coihue, puma the south, living in the mountain range, the gray fox, the coypu in the south, which is located in wetlands and swamps, and wild cat, and other introduced species like the hare.
With regard to birds, it highlights the Chucao, the Huet hued, the Pigeon, the Choroy, the Carpenter and Partridge Grande Southern, among others.
Among insects, highlights: the Stag Beetle, the Beetle of the Moon, the Mother of the Snake and Horse of the Devil.
As the fish are native and introduced species, which are a major attraction for sport fishing. The most abundant native fish are puye, carmetita, percatrucha zebra trout, mackerel of the river, and among the introduced species are rainbow trout, brook trout, brown trout and trout in Europe.

Administration
As a commune, Lago Ranco is a third-level administrative division of Chile administered by a municipal council, headed by an alcalde who is directly elected every four years. The 2008-2012 alcalde is Santiago Rosas Lobos (PDC). He was preceded by Santiago Rosas Lobos (2004–2008)

Within the electoral divisions of Chile, Lago Ranco is represented in the Chamber of Deputies by Enrique Jaramillo  (PDC) and Gastón Von Mühlenbrock (UDI) as part of the 54th electoral district, together with Pangipulli, Los Lagos, Futrono, Río Bueno, La Unión and Paillaco.

Business 
The primary economic activities in Lago Ranco are agriculture and forestry, tourism, and services. With regard to agriculture and forestry sector, according to an agroclimatic study conducted in the district, much of it does not have a good potential for agricultural activities, except the Lake Ranco.
Moreover, the climate allows all crops from the area except where the soil constraints only accept natural grasslands. In the commune dominated by mountainous terrain and only about 4.2% are suitable for agriculture.
According to the agroclimatic diagnosis made, Lago Ranco has a potential forest predominantly due to agro-ecological characteristics of the soil and the existence of abundant reserve of native forests and young plantations of exotic species, the activity is performed at a level primary operation and is characterized by an extraction process without processing timber for other more technology centers.
On a smaller scale, is the livestock and agricultural sector, which belongs to smallholder farmers who use a minimal operating system, with limited technology and geared specifically to the cultivation of traditional items such as wheat and potatoes, which is normally used for consumption, with family labor, so integrated into fewer medium-sized farmers, who use more manpower and more technology.
Besides the activities described above, the town of Lake Ranco has a potential for tourism and increased economic activity within this sector, since the community is within the Lake Ranco, which is part of the Andean Lake Tourist Zone, which is constituted as a tourist area in the process of consolidation by the Tourism Development Master Plan of the Lake District, this coupled with the great beauty that has next to its natural attractions, plus the history and cultural identity that has the commune.
It also established as part of the destination "Cuenca del Lago Ranco," in conjunction with the municipalities of Rio Bueno, Paillaco, Futrono and La Union.

References

External links
  Municipality of Lago Ranco

Populated places in Ranco Province
Communes of Chile
Populated places established in 1941
Populated lakeshore places in Chile